The 1995–96 Drexel Dragons men's basketball team represented Drexel University during the 1995–96 NCAA Division I men's basketball season. The Dragons, led by 5th year head coach Bill Herrion, played their home games at the Daskalakis Athletic Center and were members of the North Atlantic Conference (which has since changed name).

In the 1995–96 season, the Dragons won a school record 27 games, won the North Atlantic Conference men's basketball tournament for the third season in a row, qualified for the NCAA tournament for the fourth time in school history, and also won the school's first ever NCAA Tournament game in the first round of the 1996 NCAA Division I men's basketball tournament.

Drexel accomplished a 21 game home winning streak, dating back to the 1993–94 season, ending in a loss against Boston University on January 26.

After reaching the Round of 32 in the NCAA Tournament for the first time in program history, the Dragons lost to Syracuse by a score of 58–69.  Syracuse would go on to finish runner–up in the tournament, losing to Kentucky in the National Championship.

In the 1995–96 season, Malik Rose broke Drexel's individual single season record for rebounds with 409 in 31 games.

Offseason

Departures

1995 recruiting class

Roster

Schedule

|-
!colspan=9 style="background:#F8B800; color:#002663;"| Regular season
|-

|-
!colspan=9 style="background:#F8B800; color:#002663;"| 1996 North Atlantic Conference men's basketball tournament

|-
!colspan=9 style="background:#F8B800; color:#002663;"| 1996 NCAA Division I men's basketball tournament

Rankings

Awards
 Bill Herrion
NAC Coach of the Year

Mike Derocckis
NAC Rookie of the Year
NAC All-Rookie Team
NAC Rookie of the Week (4)

Jeff Myers
NAC All-Conference First Team
NAC All-Tournament Team
NAC Player of the Week

Cornelius Overby
NAC All-Tournament Team

Malik Rose
NAC Player of the Year
NAC Tournament Most Valuable Player
NAC All-Conference First Team
NAC Player of the Week (2)

References

Drexel Dragons men's basketball seasons
Drexel
1995 in sports in Pennsylvania
1996 in sports in Pennsylvania
Drexel